Donald Clendon Peebles  (5 March 1922 – 27 March 2010) was a New Zealand artist. He is regarded as a pioneer of abstract art in New Zealand, and his works are held in the collections of Auckland Art Gallery Toi o Tāmaki, the Museum of New Zealand Te Papa Tongarewa, and Christchurch Art Gallery.

Early life 
Peebles was born in Taneatua, Bay of Plenty, in 1922. His family moved to Wellington two years later, and he attended Wadestown Primary School and Wellington College. At age 15, he left school to work as a telegram boy for the New Zealand Post Office. In 1941, he joined the New Zealand Army, and during World War II he served in the New Zealand Division as a radio operator between 1943 and 1945. At the end of the war he had his first formal art training in Florence while waiting to be demobilised.

Education 
Peebles began his training in fine art at the Wellington Technical College of Art in 1947, before moving to Australia and studying under John Passmore at the Julian Ashton Art School in Sydney from 1951 to 1953.

Career 
In the early 1950s, Peebles returned from studying in Australia and moved back to New Zealand. In 1960, he won a scholarship to study in London, granted by the Association of New Zealand Art Societies. Prior to this trip, Peebles married Prue Corkill. It was in London that Peebles met constructivist painter Victor Pasmore, who became a friend and major influence.

In 1964, Peebles became a lecturer at the Canterbury School of Fine Arts in Christchurch. In 1980, he was made head of the painting department, and he lectured there until his retirement in 1986 to concentrate on painting full-time.

Peebles has exhibited in both solo and group exhibitions, including:

 New Zealand Academy of Fine Arts Special Exhibition for 1969: Five Guest Artists (with Melvin Day, John Drawbridge, Pat Hanly and Ralph Hotere) at the New Zealand Academy of Fine Arts, Wellington in 1969.
 The Harmony of Opposites, a major retrospective exhibition which toured in the 1990s.
 Don Peebles at 83 at Campbell Grant Galleries, Christchurch in 2005.
 Pieces of Eight, an exhibition that highlighted the work of eight influential New Zealand abstract artists, at Dunedin Public Art Gallery in 2010.

Honours and awards 
In the 1999 New Year Honours, Peebles was appointed an Officer of the New Zealand Order of Merit, for services to art. In 2003, Peebles received an honorary Doctorate in Literature from the University of Canterbury. In 2007, Peebles received an Arts Foundation Icon Award, awarded to only 20 living people at any one time.

Death 
Peebles died of cancer in Christchurch in 2010, and was survived by his wife Prue and their three children.

Further reading 
 Don Peebles: A Free Sense of Order, article by curator Peter Vangioni. Published in Christchurch Art Gallery's publication B.187 in 2007.
 Formal Abstraction in Post-War New Zealand Painting, article by Rodney Wilson published in Art New Zealand in 1976.
 Don Peebles: The Harmony of Opposites, text that accompanied the 1996 touring exhibition The Harmony of Objects, written by Justin Paton and published by Robert McDougall Art Gallery.

References 

1922 births
2010 deaths
Academic staff of the University of Canterbury
New Zealand painters
People from the Bay of Plenty Region
People educated at Wellington College (New Zealand)
New Zealand military personnel of World War II
Officers of the New Zealand Order of Merit
Abstract artists
Deaths from cancer in New Zealand
New Zealand expatriates in Italy